The United Nations Committee of Experts on Public Administration (CEPA) is an expert body that meets under the auspices of the United Nations Economic and Social Council in order to discuss and find ways to support the work of the Council by providing expert advice on matters concerning governance and public administration structures.

CEPA is composed of 24 members that meet annually for a one-week session at UN Headquarters in April.

History and mandate 
The Committee traces it roots back to a January 1967 meeting of experts in public administration convened by the Secretary-General in order to review the UN's program in public administration, as well as to make recommendations for the future direction of the organization in the field. The meeting made many recommendations to ECOSOC that it hoped would increase the UN's capacity in public administration:

 That in the second Development Decade (1971–80), public administration be accorded a priority place as an impact area
 That it would be desirable for the UN to elaborate more specific objectives and programs in the field of public administration
 That the United Nations Development Programme give sympathetic consideration to requests for assistance from governments of developing countries in the field of public administration
 That a separate section be created for public administration in the UN budget, or that funds be allocated for interregional and regional projects in public administration if that is not possible
 That the public administration unit at UN Headquarters be restored to the status of an independent substantive unit
 That public administration units be created in ECOSOC's regional commissions
 That the UN's program in public administration be reviewed by a Meeting of Experts every four years

On 24 May 1967, ECOSOC accepted the report of the Meeting of Experts and made several recommendations in the field of public administration. Among them were: to recommend that public administration be accorded an appropriate place in planning for the UN's second Development Decade, to request that experts in public administration be dispatched to its regional economic commissions, as well as to provide support to these commissions in the collection, analysis and exchange of technical information in the field of public administration and to convene the Meeting of Experts from time to time.

Meetings subsequently occurred in 1971 and 1975 as the Meeting of Experts on the United Nations Programme in Public Administration. In 1978, 1980, 1982, 1985, 1989, 1992 and  1994 as the Meeting of Experts on the United Nations Programme in Public Administration and Finance. And in 1995, 1997, 1998 and 2000 as the Meeting of the Group of Experts on the United Nations Programme in Public Administration and Finance.

At its 15th meeting in May 2000, the Meeting of the Group of Experts made several recommendations that were approved by ECOSOC on 27 July 2000. Among these recommendations the most important were: that the number of experts participating at its 16th session be maximized in order to increase geographical representation, that the Council review the status and reporting arrangements of the Group of Experts in order to reinforce their role due to the crucial importance of economic and social development issues relating to institutional and managerial development and that the UN establish appropriate mechanisms to provide the opportunity for ministers of Member States responsible for public administration to meet periodically.

On 20 December 2001, the Council adopted a resolution reorganizing the Group of Experts. As part of these changes, the Group was renamed the Committee of Experts in Public Administration, its membership was changed to 24 and it was required to meet biennially. It was mandated to provide expert policy advice and programmatic guidance to ECOSOC on issues relating to governance, public administration structures and processes for development.

The Committee also assists ECOSOC by reviewing trends, issues and priorities in public administration. In particular, the Committee plays a key role in helping monitor the implementation of the Sustainable Development Goals. At its annual meeting in 2018, the Committee developed the Principles of Effective Governance for Sustainable Development. These Principles are intended to help countries build effective, accountable and inclusive institutions at all levels, in the context of the 2030 Agenda. In order to achieve this, they take into account different governance structures, national realities, capacities and levels of development, and respect national policies and priorities.

Members 
Unlike most bodies of the UN, members of the CEPA meet in their personal capacity. They are nominated by the Secretary-General and approved by ECOSOC to serve four-year terms. When choosing nominees, the Secretary-General consults with Member States to find suitable candidates.

The current members of CEPA are as follow:

External links 
 Official website

References 

United Nations Economic and Social Council
Organizations established in 2000